Joaquim de Miró y Argenter (February 3 , 1849 – February 18, 1914, in Sitges) was a Spanish painter, best known for his luminist landscape paintings, such as La Malvasia (1895) which have been preserved by the Cau Ferrat Museum.

References 

1849 births
1914 deaths
19th-century Spanish male artists
Spanish male painters
19th-century Spanish painters